The Mellus Newspapers Building was a commercial building at 1661 Fort Street in Lincoln Park, Michigan. It was listed on the National Register of Historic Places in 2005, and demolished in 2010.

History
In 1933, William S. Mellus founded the Lincoln Parker, a newspaper serving the city of Lincoln Park. As the population of Lincoln Park grew, Mellus eventually needed more space, and in 1941 he constructed this building on Fort Street. Mellus also published newspapers for other downriver communities: The Allen Parker, Ecorse Advertiser, Southgate Sentinel, Taylor Tribune and Riverview Sentinel. Mellus also expanded operations into the next-door Pollack Jewellery Building. Mellus sold his newspaper chain to Panax Corp. in the early 1970s. The company remained in the building until 1986, when it merged with Heritage Newspapers. The building was sold by the Mellus family in 1994.

In 2009, the Mellus and the next-door Pollack were purchased by the Lincoln Park Downtown Development Authority for $93,000. The Mellus Building was demolished in May 2010; a small park is planned for the lot.

Description
The Mellus Newspapers Building had simple but distinguishing Art Deco characteristics exemplifying the application of these to a small commercial building. The front facade was covered with white porcelain enamel panels, and the entryway was framed with curved glass block sections. Six steel casement windows faced the front.

References

External links
Save the Mellus

Newspaper buildings
Buildings and structures in Wayne County, Michigan
Office buildings completed in 1941
National Register of Historic Places in Wayne County, Michigan
1941 establishments in Michigan
Demolished buildings and structures in Michigan
Buildings and structures demolished in 2010